Joaquín Pérez de las Heras (25 October 1936 – 20 May 2011) was a Mexican equestrian and Olympic medalist. He was born in Ameca, Jalisco.

References

Joaquín Pérez's profile at Sports Reference.com
Joaquín Pérez's obituary

1936 births
2011 deaths
Mexican male equestrians
Olympic equestrians of Mexico
Olympic bronze medalists for Mexico
Equestrians at the 1968 Summer Olympics
Equestrians at the 1972 Summer Olympics
Equestrians at the 1980 Summer Olympics
Olympic medalists in equestrian
Sportspeople from Jalisco
Medalists at the 1980 Summer Olympics
Pan American Games medalists in equestrian
Pan American Games silver medalists for Mexico
Equestrians at the 1971 Pan American Games
Medalists at the 1971 Pan American Games
People from Ameca, Jalisco
20th-century Mexican people
21st-century Mexican people